Hector Island is an uninhabited Canadian arctic island located in Hudson Strait. It is a Baffin Island offshore island in Nunavut's Qikiqtaaluk Region.

References

Islands of Baffin Island
Islands of Hudson Strait
Uninhabited islands of Qikiqtaaluk Region